Victor Gabriel Gilbert (13 February 1847 – 21 July 1933) was a French painter mostly known for his Parisian scenes and portraying market scenes there. He studied with Victor Adam (1801–1866) and subsequently with Charles Busson (1822–1908). In 1889 he was awarded a silver medal in the Société des Artistes Français, and a Bonnat prize in 1926 at the end of his career.

Gallery

References

External links

Web dedicated to Victor Gabriel Gilbert

1847 births
1933 deaths
19th-century French painters
20th-century French painters
20th-century French male artists
French male painters
Painters from Paris
19th-century French male artists